Club Sportivo Cerrito, usually known simply as Cerrito, is a Uruguayan football club based in Cerrito de la Victoria, Montevideo. They currently play in the Uruguayan Segunda División.

Titles
Uruguayan Segunda División: 2
2003, 2020

Tercera División Uruguay: 4
1951, 1970, 1982, 1998

Rivalries
The neighborhood has two sports clubs, who share a large rivalry; the Clásico del Cerrito is contested with Rentistas.

Managers
 Luis López (1998–1999)
 Marcelo Saralegui (2006–07)
 Ricardo Ortíz (2006–07)
 Jorge Barrios (2008–??)
 Julio Balerio (July 2009 – Feb 10)
 Marcelo Saralegui (2010–11)

References

External links
   

Football clubs in Uruguay
Association football clubs established in 1929
Sport in Montevideo
1929 establishments in Uruguay